This is a list of wars that the Republic of Latvia have participated in.

The Republic of Latvia existed as a de jure sovereign state from 17 June 1940 to 4 May 1990, and was represented by the Latvian Diplomatic Service dealing with a limited part of the state functions of the Republic of Latvia. The Republic of Latvia did not engage in warfare during the period of occupation.

Wars

Latvia history-related lists
Latvia
Latvian military-related lists